The American ermine or American stoat (Mustela richardsonii) is a species of mustelid native to most of North America.

Taxonomy 
It was long considered conspecific with the stoat (M. erminea), but a 2021 study found it to be a distinct species, forming distinct genetic clades from erminea. The finding has been accepted by the American Society of Mammalogists. The Haida ermine (M. haidarum) is thought to be a hybrid species originating from ancient hybridization between M. erminea and M. richardsonii.

The specific epithet refers to Arctic explorer and naturalist John Richardson.

Distribution 
The species is found throughout most of North America aside from most of Alaska (although it is found on some islands in southeastern Alaska), eastern Yukon, most of Arctic Canada, and Greenland, where it is replaced by M. erminea. It reaches the northern extent of its range in Baffin Island and a portion of eastern mainland Nunavut and ranges from here to cover almost all of western North America south to northern New Mexico, and eastern North America south to northern Virginia. It is absent from most of the Southeastern United States and the Great Plains.

Behavior 
In North America, where the ecological niche for rat- and rabbit-sized prey is taken by the larger long-tailed weasel (Neogale frenata), the American ermine preys on mice, voles, shrews, and young cottontails.

Subspecies 
About 13 subspecies are known:

Relationships with humans 
The fur of ermine was valued by the Tlingit and other indigenous peoples of the Pacific Northwest Coast. They could be attached to traditional regalia and cedar bark hats as status symbols or made into shirts.

Gallery

References

Bibliography

 
 

Weasels
Mammals of Canada
Mammals of North America
Mammals described in 1838